United Nations General Assembly Resolution 491 was adopted on 28 September 1950 for the admission of Republic of Indonesia to the United Nations. Accordingly to the recommendation by the United Nations Security Council Resolution 86, two days before the 289th UN General Assembly meeting, in which 10 countries voted for the admission of Indonesia meanwhile China abstained from the voting.

Indonesia became the 60th member of United Nations until it withdrew in 1965 and established its own intergovernmental organization known as CONEFO, and rejoined in 1966.

See also
Indonesia and the United Nations
United Nations Security Council Resolution 86

Reference

Text of the UNGA Resolutions at undocs.org
 

491
1950 in Indonesia
Indonesia and the United Nations